United Nations Security Council resolution 1245, adopted unanimously on 11 June 1999, after recalling resolutions 1181 (1998), 1220 (1999) and 1231 (1999) on the situation in Sierra Leone, the Council extended the mandate of the United Nations Observer Mission in Sierra Leone (UNOMSIL) for a further six months until 13 December 1999.

The Security Council acknowledged the role of the Economic Community of West African States (ECOWAS) and its Monitoring Group (ECOMOG) and expressed concern over the fragile situation in Sierra Leone.

The resolution stressed that an overall political settlement and reconciliation were essential for a peaceful resolution of the conflict. In this regard it welcomed talks in Lomé between the Government of Sierra Leone and rebel representatives of the Revolutionary United Front (RUF). All parties were urged to remain committed to the negotiations and the Council noted in particular the role of the President of Togo Gnassingbé Eyadéma and of the international community in facilitating this process.

The Council noted the proposal of the Secretary-General Kofi Annan to expand UNOMSIL's presence in the country with a revised mandate if the talks between the Sierra Leone government and RUF rebel representatives were successful. Finally, the Secretary-General was required to the keep the Council informed on developments in Sierra Leone.

See also
 History of Sierra Leone
 List of United Nations Security Council Resolutions 1201 to 1300 (1998–2000)
 Sierra Leone Civil War

References

External links
 
Text of the Resolution at undocs.org

 1245
1999 in Sierra Leone
 1245
Sierra Leone Civil War
June 1999 events